Travis Willingham (born August 3, 1981) is an American voice actor. Some of his notable roles include Roy Mustang in Fullmetal Alchemist and Brotherhood, Cleo in Glass Fleet, Ginko in Mushishi, Portgas D. Ace in the Funimation re-dub of One Piece, Takashi "Mori" Morinozuka in Ouran High School Host Club, Yu Kanda in D. Gray-man, Guile in Street Fighter, Knuckles the Echidna in Sonic the Hedgehog, Lon'qu in Fire Emblem Awakening and Thor in various Marvel Comics media. He is a regular cast member of the web series Critical Role, in which professional voice actors play Dungeons & Dragons. He currently serves as the chief executive officer of Critical Role Productions.

Early life
Willingham was born in Dallas. He became interested in acting in fifth grade, and after sixth grade, he moved from private school to J.R. Long Middle School. He graduated from Woodrow Wilson High School, and studied at Texas Christian University. He eventually moved to Los Angeles in the early 2000s to pursue an acting career.

Career
Willingham rose to prominence in the voice acting world for his portrayal of Roy Mustang in Fullmetal Alchemist, which he later reprised in Fullmetal Alchemist: Brotherhood. His other notable roles include Yu Kanda in D.Gray-man, Cleo in Glass Fleet, Ginko in Mushishi, Portgas D. Ace in the Funimation re-dub of One Piece and Takashi Morinozuka in Ouran High School Host Club. He also voices Thor in several Marvel projects and King Roland II in Disney Junior's Sofia the First. From 2010 to 2018, he was the voice of Knuckles the Echidna in the Sonic the Hedgehog series.

Willingham is also a cast member of the popular Dungeons & Dragons web series Critical Role, where he played Grog in Campaign One, Fjord in Campaign Two, as well as Sir Bertrand Bell and Chetney Pock O'Pea in Campaign 3. Critical Role was both the Webby Winner and the People's Voice Winner in the "Games (Video Series & Channels)" category at the 2019 Webby Awards; the show was also both a Finalist and the Audience Honor Winner at the 2019 Shorty Awards. After becoming hugely successful, the Critical Role cast left the Geek & Sundry network in early 2019 and set up their own production company, Critical Role Productions; Willingham serves as chief executive officer. Soon after, they aimed to raise $750,000 on Kickstarter to create an animated series of their first campaign, but ended up raising over $11 million. In November 2019, Amazon Prime Video announced that they had acquired the streaming rights to this animated series, now titled The Legend of Vox Machina; Willingham will reprise his role as Grog.

Personal life
Willingham married voice actress Laura Bailey on September 25, 2011 at Maravilla Gardens in Camarillo. They reside in Los Angeles. They have one son.
He has a brother named Carson.

Willingham is a lifelong fan of the Dallas Cowboys. He has participated in some triathlons.

Filmography

Voice acting

Anime

Animation

Film

Video games

Live-action

Film

Television

Web series

References

External links

 
 
 
 Travis Willingham at CrystalAcids Voice Actor Database
 
  – 2018 video interview by Critical Role

Living people

Place of birth missing (living people)
American male film actors
American male television actors
American male video game actors
American male voice actors
American male web series actors
Texas Christian University alumni
21st-century American male actors
Year of birth missing (living people)